The North Carolina Tar Heels softball team represents the University of North Carolina at Chapel Hill in NCAA Division I college softball.  They participate in the Atlantic Coast Conference.

Home venues 

Since 2002, the team has played at the UNC Softball Complex. The complex is fully floodlit and includes a separate practice field, a press box, and concessions.  Coaches' offices are also on site in the adjoining building housing the locker rooms.  Williams Field and Anderson Stadium, capacity 500, were officially dedicated following a game against Georgia Tech on April 23, 2006. Previously, they had played at Finley Field and Williams Field.

Individual honors 

Natalie Anter represented Italy at the 2004 Summer Olympics in Athens, Greece.

All-time record 

The softball team was officially established in 1977, switching to fast pitch play in 1984.  Conference play officially began in 1992, with a first qualification for the NCAA Tournament in 2001.

See also
List of NCAA Division I softball programs

References